The Basler Messeturm (Basel Trade Fair Tower) is the third tallest building in Basel, Switzerland. Completed in 2003, it has 32 floors and is 105 m (344 ft) tall.

There is a bar lounge on the top floor.  The Hyperion hotel operates a 200-room four-star hotel in the building, which also includes offices.

References

External links
 Emporis.com

Buildings and structures completed in 2003
Buildings and structures in Basel
Skyscrapers in Switzerland
Hotels in Switzerland
Skyscraper office buildings
Skyscraper hotels
21st-century architecture in Switzerland